Stakkattakktwo is the fourth and final album of the British glam metal band Wrathchild. It was released on October 3, 2011, via Perris Records. The name is a reference to the band's first album, Stakk Attakk (1984). It is the only Wrathchild album to feature Gaz "Psychowrath" Harris who left the band in August 2013.

Track listing

Band members 
Gaz "Psychowrath" Harris - Lead Vocals
Marc Angel - Bass, Backing vocals
Phil "Wrathchild" Vokins - Guitar, Backing vocals
Eddie Star - Drums, Backing vocals

References

External links 
Wrathchild Official Website

2011 albums
Wrathchild albums